Rosie Elizabeth Roff is an English model, actress and influencer.

Career
After working as a main model for Apple Bottom Jeans UK, Roff received interest from various companies. She has worked for magazines such as Maxim and FHM, including cover and worldwide editions. In 2011, she was voted by FHM as one of the "100 sexiest women in the world". Roff has been considered by FHM as their "Instagram Model of 2016."

References

External links
 

Living people
British female models
1989 births